The Penfield mood organ is a fictional device in Philip K. Dick's 1968 science fiction novel Do Androids Dream of Electric Sheep? that is used to modify emotional states, controlled by the user entering a number on its keyboard. The device is described in the novel as using "Penfield artificial brain stimulation". A "Penfield wave transmitter" is also described in the book, as a weapon for inducing cataplexy.

The name of the device is a reference to the neurosurgeon Wilder Penfield. Dick also references other similar devices in his novel We Can Build You, including the Hammerstein Mood Organ and Waldteufel Euphoria, explicitly referencing the work of Wilder Penfield.

Modern developments toward emotion-modifying devices have been compared to the Penfield mood organ.

See also 
 Voight-Kampff machine

References

External links 
 An extract from Do Androids Dream of Electric Sheep? describing the mood organ

Fictional technology
Philip K. Dick
Fiction about mind control